Jack Paul Hunt (born 6 December 1990) is an English professional footballer who plays as a defender for Sheffield Wednesday. Though primarily a right back, Hunt can also play on the right of midfield.

Career

Huddersfield Town

Having joined up with Huddersfield Town at the age of nine, Hunt went through the club's academy system, starting in May 2008 and signed his first professional contract with the club in April 2009.

Having previously appeared as an unused substitute for Lee Clark's first team on four occasions throughout the 2009–10 season at Huddersfield Town, Hunt signed a contract extension with Huddersfield Town in March 2010.

After his loan spell at Chesterfield came to an end, Hunt made his Huddersfield debut as a substitute in the 0–0 draw against Colchester United at the Galpharm Stadium on 22 January 2011. He then made his first start for the club in their 2–1 defeat to Arsenal at the Emirates Stadium in the Fourth Round of the FA Cup on 30 January 2011, which was then followed by his first league start in the 2–0 win over Carlisle United on 1 February 2011. He scored his first goal for the club against Peterborough United on 9 April 2011, in the last minute to salvage a 1–1 draw. Hunt finished the 2010–11 season, making twenty appearances for the club.

Hunt's first start in the 2011–12 season came against Port Vale in the League Cup on 9 August 2011. He scored with a 25-yard shot to put Huddersfield 3–1 up – they won 4–2 on the night. His first league start of the season came four days later in a 2–2 draw away at Rochdale on 13 August 2011. He scored his first league goal of the 2011–12 season against Leyton Orient on 24 September, he made the score 2–0 with a shot from 20 yards – the game ended 2–2. Due to his overall performance of the course of the season, Hunt, along with his teammate Jordan Rhodes, were voted into the PFA League 1 Team of the Year. Hunt scored his third goal of the season on 12 May 2012, in Huddersfield's play-off semi-final away victory over Milton Keynes Dons at Stadium MK giving Huddersfield a 2–0 win going into the second leg. He then played the full 90minutes plus extra time in the final as Huddersfield Town went on to win promotion after an 8–7 penalty shoot-out win over fellow Yorkshire club Sheffield United with Hunt scoring the 17th penalty of the shootout. Following the club's promotion to the Championship, Hunt signed a one-year contract extension.

Ahead of the 2012–13 season, Hunt began to attracted interests from clubs, such as, Fulham. Hunt made his first start of the season in the opening round of the League Cup in the 2–0 away deft at Preston North End on Monday 13 August 2012, this was then followed by his first league game of the season away at Cardiff in Huddersfield's first game in the Football League Championship for 11 years in a 1–0 away loss. Hunt gave an impressive display in his first home game of 2012–13 winning an injury time penalty which Jordan Rhodes scored to give Huddersfield a 1–1 draw on 21 August 2012. Hunt was also named in Sky Sports team of the week on 23 August for his performance in Huddersfield first two games of the league campaign. Then, Hunt was given a straight red card and an abusive language towards referee Graham Scott during a 4–0 loss against Millwall and injured his hamstring during a match against Bolton Wanderers on 2 April 2013. After undergoing a successful scan, Hunt returned to the first team and managed to regain in the first team for the 2012–13 season, playing in the left–back position, where he made forty appearances.

The 2013–14 season saw Hunt being linked with a move to Premier League side Sunderland and Swansea City. Also tracking Hunt were Reading, Wigan Athletic and Cardiff City. However, Huddersfield Town revealed there were no enquiries to sign Hunt. Despite this, Hunt remained in the first regular, where he began to play wide right at the start of the season and provided assist one of James Vaughan goals in a 2–1 win over Bradford City in the first round of the League Cup. Once again, Hunt found himself in the transfer speculation, as Crystal Palace made a £2 million bid for Hunt.

Loan spells

In the 2009–10 season, he was sent on loan to Conference National side Grays Athletic. Hunt made four appearances for Grays Athletic before returning to his parent club.

In the 2010–11 season, Huddersfield manager Lee Clark sent Hunt out on loan to Football League Two side Chesterfield for six months, which lasted until January. Hunt made his debut in the 2–1 win over Barnet on 7 August 2010. Then on 11 September 2010, Hunt provided an assist for Scott Boden to score the equaliser, in a 1–1 draw against Morecambe. Hunt became a first team regular, playing as a right–back, making 20 appearances and returned to the Galpharm after his loan expired in early January 2011.

Crystal Palace

Premier League side Crystal Palace signed Hunt on a four-year deal, from Huddersfield Town, on 2 September 2013. Upon joining Crystal Palace, Hunt said on the move, quoting: "The interest from Crystal Palace filled me with a lot of confidence. Obviously the Premier is the best league in the world and I jumped at the chance to go to Palace. I spoke to the manager for a good hour, hour-and-a-half and the chat was brilliant, he is a brilliant man and very honest. I can't wait to play for him and you can see why he has such a good team spirit there, and that was only after one conversation with him".

However, before he could make his début, Hunt broke his ankle in training on 9 September, ruling him out for up to four months. By January, Hunt returned to training after being told by the club's medical that he was given all-clear.

After his transfer to Sheffield Wednesday, Hunt said he stood by his decision over signing for Crystal Palace. The Croydon Advertiser later listed Hunt as among eleven players to never live up expectations.

Loan spells

On 29 January 2014, Hunt joined Championship side Barnsley on loan for the remainder of the 2013–14 season. Three days later, on 1 February 2014, Hunt made his Barnsley debut, in a 1–0 against Sheffield Wednesday and provided an assist in the next game on 8 February 2014, Hunt provided an assist for Chris O'Grady to score the first goal of the season, in a 2–2 draw against Ipswich Town. However, Hunt was restricted to 10 appearances for the club, due to match fitness and injury that kept him out for the rest of the season. As a result, Hunt was unable to help the club survive relegation, as they were relegated to League One.

On 22 July 2014, Hunt joined Nottingham Forest on loan until 1 January 2015. Upon joining Nottingham Forest, Hunt was given number 17 shirt. On his first day at the club, Hunt appeared at training, but ended up having a head wound, resulting in eight stitches. Hunt made his Nottingham Forest in the opening game of the season against Blackpool, where he provided an assist for Chris Burke, in a 2–0 win. Hunt made an impact at the end of August when he provided an assist for Matty Fryatt to score the winning goal, in a 2–1 win over Bournemouth, and followed up, providing another assist, in a 4–0 win over Reading. Hunt's impact at Nottingham Forest with nineteen appearances had convinced the club's management to express interest in signing him permanently. However, Crystal Palace asked Nottingham Forest to increase their bid for him. This was later confirmed by Palace owner Steve Parish, who stated the club should have signed him permanently and revealed their decision to increase the price to sign Hunt. Hunt's loan spell at Nottingham Forest came to an end on 31 December 2014 and he returned to his parent club. After this, Hunt stated his gratitude to the club, stating the club helped him fall in love with football again.

Despite being linked with a move to Blackburn Rovers, it was announced on 30 January 2015, that Hunt had opted to join Championship club Rotherham United on loan until 2 May 2015. The next day, Hunt made his Rotherham United debut, playing 90 minutes, in a 1–1 draw against Charlton Athletic. Hunt then provided an assist for Kári Árnason to score the first goal of the game, in a 2–0 win over his former club, Huddersfield Town on 7 March 2015. Hunt made ten appearances for the club, as he helped them survive relegation in the Championship to ensure playing in the second season.

Sheffield Wednesday

On 3 July 2015, Hunt joined Championship club Sheffield Wednesday on loan for the duration of the 2015–16 season. Upon joining the club, Hunt was given the number 32 shirt ahead of the new season.

Hunt made his Sheffield Wednesday debut in the opening game of the season, where he played at right-back and for the full 90 minutes, in a 2–0 win over Bristol City. Hunt found himself competing at right-back with Liam Palmer, but managed to retain the position despite suffering from a knee injury.

On 13 January 2016, after playing 22 games as part of his season long loan, Hunt joined Sheffield Wednesday on a three-and-a-half year deal, signing for an undisclosed fee. Hunt's first game after signing for the club on a permanent basis came on 16 January 2016, in a 2–0 win over Leeds United. A month after joining the club permanently, Hunt provided an assist for Lucas João to score the fourth goal of the season, in a 4–0 win over Brentford on 13 February 2016. Hunt would later help the club reach the play-offs and in the second leg, Hunt provided the assist for Ross Wallace, in a 1–1 draw against Brighton & Hove Albion. Hunt started as a right-back in the play-off Championship Final against Hull City, playing 90 minutes, but lost 1–0. In his first season at the club, Hunt made 40 appearances in all competitions.

Bristol City 
On 6 July 2018, it was announced that Hunt had joined fellow Championship side Bristol City. He joined the Robins for an undisclosed fee, signing a three-year contract.

on 14 May 2021, Hunt left Bristol City following the expiration of his contract thus making him a free agent.

Return to Sheffield Wednesday
On 22 July 2021, Hunt sealed a return to Sheffield Wednesday. Hunt would confirm he signed a one-year deal with a one-year option based on promotion back to the Championship.  He would make his second competitive debut for Sheffield Wednesday on 1 August 2021, at home to former club Huddersfield Town. Hunt would score his first goal for Wednesday across both spells at the club on 26 March 2022 against Cheltenham Town. After missing out on promotion during the playoffs, the club would offer him a new contract following the end of the 2021–22 season, signing a new contract in June 2022.

Personal life
Born in Rothwell, England, Hunt said he considered himself a Leeds lad.

Career statistics

Honours
Huddersfield Town
Football League One play-offs: 2011–12

Individual
PFA Team of the Year: 2011–12 League One
Huddersfield Town Young Player of the Season: 2011–12

References

External links

1990 births
Living people
People from Rothwell, West Yorkshire
Footballers from Leeds
English footballers
Association football defenders
Huddersfield Town A.F.C. players
Grays Athletic F.C. players
Chesterfield F.C. players
Crystal Palace F.C. players
Barnsley F.C. players
Rotherham United F.C. players
Nottingham Forest F.C. players
Sheffield Wednesday F.C. players
Bristol City F.C. players
English Football League players
National League (English football) players